Erkan Martin (born 13 April 1984) is a German retired professional footballer who played as a forward. He had a short stint as a professional with Altay in the Süper Lig, but spent most of his career as an amateur in Turkey and Germany.

Martin Martin made his professional debut with Altay in a 1-0 Süper Lig loss to Orduspor on 29 October 2006.

Personal life
Martin is the younger brother of the Turkish international footballer Ersen Martin. After his footballing career, Martin got his license to become a professional football scout and manager.

References

External links
 
 
 Anpfiff Profile

1984 births
Living people
People from Marktredwitz
Sportspeople from Upper Franconia
German footballers
German people of Turkish descent
Altay S.K. footballers
İzmirspor footballers
Akçaabat Sebatspor footballers
Giresunspor footballers
Süper Lig players
TFF Second League players
Association football forwards
Footballers from Bavaria